Hamed Zamani is an Iranian football defender who plays for Rah Ahan in the Iran Pro League.

Club career
In summer of 2013, he joined Rah Ahan. In 2014, he was suspended and arrested because of his conscription problems. He joined to Niroye Zamini to spend his conscription period. In winter 2015 he rejoined Rah Ahan.

Club career statistics

References

External links
 Hamed Zamani at IranLeague.ir

1989 births
Living people
Iranian footballers
Rah Ahan players
Association football defenders
People from Gorgan